Manuel Seidl (born 26 October 1988) is an Austrian footballer who plays as a midfielder for Wiener Neustädt.

References

External links

1988 births
Living people
Austrian footballers
Association football midfielders
Austrian Football Bundesliga players
2. Liga (Austria) players
SV Mattersburg players
Wolfsberger AC players
SC Wiener Neustadt players
SKU Amstetten players